Francis Joseph Mullin (December 16, 1906 – February 13, 1997), also often known as F.J. Mullin or Joe Mullin, was an American academic and the seventh president of Shimer College. He was raised Catholic, but became an Episcopalian as a teenager. He was key in engineering Shimer's brief period as an Episcopal-affiliated college; the school had previously had a Baptist affiliation.

Early life and education

Mullin was born in 1906 in El Paso, Texas.  He was the second son of Joseph Peter Mullin, who was the head of the International Business College in El Paso.  He was orphaned at age 14, and passed from one relative to another. While living with his aunt, he converted from the Catholicism of his father's Irish family to the Episcopal faith of the maternal Norville side of his family.

Mullin received his bachelor's degree from the University of Missouri in 1929, and went on to study at the University of Chicago, where he completed his Master of Science in 1933 and his PhD in 1936.

From 1936 to 1938 Mullin was on the faculty of the University of Texas Medical Branch at Galveston.  Mullin served as a professor of medicine at the University of Chicago from 1939 to 1951, as well as serving as dean of students there for part of this time.  He also served as dean of the faculties and professor of physiology at the Chicago Medical School from 1951 to 1954.

Shimer College presidency

In 1954 Mullin assumed the presidency of Shimer College, then located in Mount Carroll, Illinois.  Shimer had adopted a four-year Great Books curriculum in 1950. Mullin sought to build "a community of scholars where intellectual inquiry is the highest value". The college at the time had extremely low levels of fundraising, due in part to its previous history as a junior college. Mullin tripled fundraising to approximately $150,000 per year, but nonetheless the college faced insolvency in the summer of 1956. By recruiting General Motors executive Nelson Dezendorf as a donor and trustee, Mullin was able to keep the college open.

In 1966, an internal struggle broke out within Shimer that subsequently became known as the "Grotesque Internecine Struggle". A group of dissident faculty, led initially by Dean David W. Weiser, complained that Mullin did not share the governance of the college sufficiently. With the support of the board, Mullin prevailed, but this led to the loss of a large number of students and faculty. Mullin tendered his resignation in 1967, and retired in August 1968.

Mullin and his wife, Alma Hill Mullin, had two sons. One of them was Mark Mullin, who authored a memoir including reminiscences of his father, entitled The Headmaster's Run.  The other was noted oceanographer Michael Mullin.

Works cited

Notes

See also
History of Shimer College

1906 births
1997 deaths
University of Chicago alumni
University of Missouri alumni
Presidents of Shimer College
Rosalind Franklin University of Medicine and Science faculty
Shimer College faculty
University of Chicago faculty
20th-century American Episcopalians
Converts to Anglicanism from Roman Catholicism
People from El Paso, Texas
University of Texas Medical Branch faculty
American people of Irish descent
20th-century American academics